Jack Hayter is a British musician. He is best known as a multi instrumentalist with Hefner but is also an acclaimed folk singer-songwriter in his own right. Hayter also played with alt-country band Spongefinger and folktronica band Dollboy. Hayter is also frequently used as a session pedal steel guitar player in the London alternative scene.

Biography

Early years and Spongefinger (1994–1999)
Jack Hayter first made a mark in the UK with the Alt.Country group Spongefinger who released two well received albums on Volcano Records/Cargo Distribution. The group were referred to as "Dennis Hopper's House Band" by Organ and NME press. They also served as the backing band on the "Immortal Rich" album by TV Smith (of The Adverts) in 1996. During this time he also contributed to the "Big Stick" EP from Rhatigan.

Hefner (1998–2002)
Despite modest success with Spongefinger, Hayter came into prominence when he joined Hefner full-time in 1999 as a multi-instrumentalist (though he had been playing live with them in 1998), alongside Darren Hayman, Antony Harding and John Morrison. In Hefner, Hayter recorded and released numerous albums, singles and EPs for the Too Pure label. They had several top 75 singles and recorded a number of sessions for John Peel and Steve Lamacq.

Hefner would play all over the world, including sets at festivals like Festival Internacional de Benicàssim, Big Chill Festival, V Festival and headline slots at Festivals like Reading & Leeds. They would also play bills with artists like Sebadoh, Elliott Smith, Flaming Lips, Billy Bragg and Life Without Buildings.

Hefner would quietly dissolve in 2002 after the "Dead Media" album on which Jack Hayter gave his first lead vocal performance. Jack would later compile the posthumous live album "Kick, Snare, Hats, Ride" and provide liner notes for "The Best of Hefner".

Solo (2001–present)
Since Hefner went quiet in 2001, Hayter debuted as a solo artist with the solo album "Practical Wireless" on Absolutely Kosher Records. Pitchfork complimented Jack's voice, calling it "one of the weariest, most world-beaten voices around" and remarked that "Hefner's just holding you back, Jack.". The album was remembered nearly a decade later when featured by Faded Glamour in a 'Buried Treasure' article.

Save for a number of remixes and compilation appearances, Jack's output was sparse following the release of the album, though he would play pedal steel and other instruments on a large number of records from musicians as diverse as Tram, Mark Mulcahy and The Wildhearts. He would also be seen opening for artists like KT Tunstall, Martin Grech, Darren Hayman & The Secondary Modern, Wreckless Eric, Amy Rigby and fellow Absolutely Kosher alumni The Mountain Goats.

He made his solo return at the start of 2011. Through the encouragement of Benjamin Shaw, Hayter signed with UK independent record label Audio Antihero (best known at the time for Nosferatu D2) and released a new EP called "Sucky Tart". The EP was well received by press with isthismusic? giving it 5/5, The Organ naming it their 'thing of the day' and calling it "his finest moments yet" and The Line of Best Fit praised him for having "the imagination to break from the usually tough (and boring/overdone/tiresome) grasps of folk".

Tom Robinson also played opening track "I Stole The Cutty Sark" prior to release on his BBC 6 Music show and "A Doll's House" was subsequently played by Tom Ravenscroft (whose father John Peel had been a notable supporter of Hefner). Hayter promoted the release with sessions for regional stations like Resonance FM, X-Stream East and Dandelion Radio.

In April 2012, Hayter unveiled his next project, "The Sisters of St. Anthony" – a 12 part singles series, to last a full year. The series was launched with a show opening for The Wave Pictures and live sessions for the likes of This Is Fake DIY, Phoenix FM and Triple R FM. The series has featured musical contributions from Hefner alumni Darren Hayman and Antony Harding and guest artwork from Benjamin Shaw and Sexton Ming. The series enjoyed praise and acclaim from press and radio, including Tom Robinson's Fresh on the Net, 4FM, GoldFlakePaint, 7BitArcade, The Music Fix, This Is Fake DIY, The 405 and others.

In November 2012, Hayter contributed a re-working of his "The West Beach" single for the Audio Antihero produced "Hüsker Doo-wop" Charity EP to raise money to repair damages to independent music organisations in New York following Hurricane Sandy. On 17 December, Hayter gave his final live session of 2012 for "The Wrong Rock Show" on the legendary Bush Radio, featuring the rarely performed "So Farewell Then Peter Murphy" and a cover of "Save Me" by Melanie Safka, recent single "Glass Bells Chime" was aired to close the show. The show was co-hosted by Audio Antihero and included a session from label-mate and Fighting Kites guitarist Broken Shoulder, it was promoted and featured by Rolling Stone. Hayter kicked off 2013 with a session for The Joyzine Radio Show on Croydon Radio and a new single, "Charlotte Badger" which found airplay on FM4. Follow up single "Sisters of St. Anthony" featured guest vocals from Suzanne Rhatigan of Rhatigan. The series ended with the 12th and final single "Quotes".

In July 2017 The WIAIWYA label commissioned and released a 77 minute long lighthouse inspired concept piece called "Flashes and Occultations" by Hayter. Tracing the journey of a light-vessel captain and drawing on the imagery of 1940's propaganda films such as Men of the Lightship. The Irish poet Aoife Mannix supplied some poetry This was one of a series of 7 such pieces produced for the label by 7 acts. Hayter also contributed to the Papernut Cambridge contributionto the 77 at 7 series ("Anything You Touch is Art")

Other Post Hefner works
Though Hefner have not fully reformed, Hayter and Darren Hayman toured in 2008 playing Hefner songs and Hayter has contributed to various post-Hefner recordings/projects from both ANT and Darren Hayman and both of them appear on his "Sisters of St. Anthony Series"

Outside of his Hefner and solo work, Hayter is probably best known for his work as a studio and live mainstay of acclaimed progressive folktronica act Dollboy.

Hayter also contributed the music to the short film by the director John Hardwick titled To Have And To Hold, which starred Susanne Lothar and had two poems published in the second Tall Lighthouse poetry review "Automatic Lighthouse". Since 2008, he has also worked extensively with the British Film Institute on various educational film projects made with children in North Kent.

He has more recently been working with the Gare Du Nord label (co-run by Ian Button), contributing to recordings and live performances by Raleigh Long and Papernut Cambridge. Hayter also played Pedal Steel on Mark Fry's album, South Wind, Clear Sky (2014).

Since 2014, Hayter has been a member of Papernut Cambridge, The 1980s inspired electronic soul band FXU2 Ralegh Long's and Non-Blank (a Hastings-based arts project with Oliver Cherer, Riz Maslen and Darren Morris) Non-Blank have performed a number of improvised soundtracks to classic films in South coast independent cinemas and at The Latitude Festival in 2017.

Solo discography

Albums
Practical Wireless (Absolutely Kosher Records, 2002)
The Sisters of St. Anthony – A singles series in 12 parts (Audio Antihero, 2012–2013)
Flashes and Occultations (WIAIWYA, 2017)
Abbey Wood (Gare Du Nord, March 2018)

EPs
Sucky Tart (Audio Antihero, 2011)
Dandelion Sessions – March 2011 (BarelyOut Recordings, 2011)

Singles
"The Anti-Santa" (Fika Recordings, 2011)
"The Shackleton" (Audio Antihero, 2012)
"Farewell Jezebel" feat. Darren Hayman and Anthony Harding (Audio Antihero, 2012)
"Sweet JD" (Audio Antihero, 2012)
"Yr Lucky Charm [Bad Ju Ju Version]" (Audio Antihero, 2012)
"Yankee Dancy" feat. Anthony Harding (Audio Antihero, 2012)
"King of The Shale" (Audio Antihero, 2012)
"The West Beach" (Audio Antihero, 2012)
"Cathy's Wedding" (Audio Antihero, 2012)
"Glass Bells Charm" with Woodcraft Folk (Audio Antihero, 2012)
"Charlotte Badger" (Audio Antihero, 2013)
"Sisters of St. Anthony" with Suzanne Rhatigan (Audio Antihero, 2013)
"Quotes" (Audio Antihero, 2013)
You & Me – EP with Benjamin Shaw, Cloud and Broken Shoulder (Audio Antihero, 2014)

Compilations
A Very Cherry Christmas (Cherryade Records, 2006) – contributes "Bugger All To Do in Wagin"
Bob Hope Would: A charity compilation of exclusives and otherwise with all proceeds to be split between Japan Society, Shelterbox, Red Cross, Save The Children and The Japan Earthquake and Tsunami Relief Fund. (Audio Antihero, 2011) – contributes "So Farewell Then Peter Murphy"
Five Years: Volume One (Unwashed Territories, 2011) – contributes "I Stole The Cutty Sark (Dandelion Session)"
Audio Antihero Presents: "Some.Alternate.Universe" for FSID: A charity compilation for The Foundation for the Study of Infant Deaths. (Audio Antihero, 2012) – contributes "It Will"
Audio Antihero's Commercial Suicide Sampler (Audio Antihero, 2012) – contributes "I Stole The Cutty Sark" 
Do I Have to be Alright, All of the Time?' A Jason Molina Benefit Album (Jason Molina Benefit, 2012) – contributes "Just be Simple" (Songs: Ohia cover)
The Hüsker Doo-wop EP for New York (Audio Antihero/Hear It For NY, 2012) – contributes "The West Beach (Hear it for NY session)"
Into The Light: Volume One for Pussy Riot (Unwashed Territories, 2012) – contributes "The Shackleton (Dandelion Session)"
Weary Engine Blues: Crossroads for Jason Molina (Graveface Records, 2013) – contributes "Just Be Simple" (Songs: Ohia cover)
Audio Antihero Presents: "REGAL VS STEAMBOAT" for Rape Crisis (Audio Antihero, 2013) – contributes "Sweet JD (Stylocoustic Version)"
Five Long Years (Audio Antihero, 2014) – contributes "Quotes"
21 Songs for John (Unwashed Territories, 2014) – contributes "Horsemeat for Dogs"
A Girl and a Gun (WIAIWYA, 2015) – contributes "Die Another Day"
Songs About Albums: Volume 1 (The Album Wall, 2015) – contributes "The Stranger Fair"
Frog – Catchyalater – Single (Audio Antihero, 2016) – contributes "Catchyalater" (Jack Hayter Remix)
BERN YR IDOLS (Bernie Sanders benefit compilation) (Audio Antihero, 2016) – contributes "The Unsent Letter" (Machine Gun Fellatio cover)
Audio Antihero Presents: "Unpresidented Jams" for SPLC & NILC (Audio Antihero, 2017) - contributes "The New Colossus"
A Very Cherry Christmas - Volume 12 (Cherryade Records, 2017) - contributes "The Beheading Game"
The Desperation Club - A Cloud Tribute Compilation - (Audio Antihero, 2018) - contributes "Stomach Pit"
Elder Statesman: Nine Long Years of Audio Antihero Records (Audio Antihero, 2019) - contributes "I Stole the Cutty Sark"

References

External links
Hefner official website
Hayter's Myspace page
Hayter's official website
Hayter's Audio Antihero profile

Year of birth missing (living people)
Living people
British male singer-songwriters
British folk singers
British folk guitarists
Pedal steel guitarists
British multi-instrumentalists